The Golden Angel (Czech: Zlatý Anděl) is an administrative complex situated in Prague. The designer was French architect Jean Nouvel.

The structure is located in the immediate vicinity of The Angel Crossroad (Křižovatka Anděl) which was named after The Golden Angel's Pharmacy (Lékárna U Zlatého Anděla). The pharmacy as well as its symbol - gilded statue of an angel - was demolished in 1980 to make a room for new subway station.

Origin
Nouvel  started The Golden Angel project in 1994. The construction was launched five years later and the complex was completed in November 2000. The exclusive investor of the building is the ING Real Estate company.

Exterior

The Golden Angel is curve-shaped and edges are rounded. Technology of the layered facade allows to vary the building appearance during the daytime.
Glassed facades bear passages from the writings of notable authors who had been creating in Prague: Jiří Orten, Konstantin Biebl, Franz Kafka, Guillaume Apollinaire, Rainer Maria Rilke and Gustav Meyrink.

Picture of an Angel-protector, inspired by a Wim Wenders' film Wings of Desire, looks down upon the golden Angel crossroads, floating among clouds.

A unique technology has been developed for portraying clouds and the Angel. Graphics is printed on an advert foil and cut into millimetre-sized dots, which are stuck onto the facade in a density of 80,000/m2. Number of dots on the complex is reaching 150 millions; the printing and cutting process ran uninterruptedly for over 7 months.

References

Buildings and structures in Prague
Office buildings completed in 2000
Postmodern architecture in the Czech Republic
Tourist attractions in Prague
Smíchov
2000 establishments in the Czech Republic
21st-century architecture in the Czech Republic